Tom Spencer may refer to:

Tom Spencer (rugby league) (born 1991), English rugby league footballer
Tom Spencer (baseball) (born 1951), American former Chicago White Sox outfielder and minor league baseball manager
Tom Spencer (cricketer) (1914–1995), British cricketer and international umpire
Tom Spencer (politician) (born 1948), former Conservative Member of the European Parliament
Tom Spencer (musician) (born 1967), British singer and guitarist for The Professionals and The Yo Yos

See also
Thomas Spencer (disambiguation)